Cosmopterix scribaiella is a moth of the family Cosmopterigidae. It is found from most of Europe (except the Balkan Peninsula) to Japan.

The wingspan is about 10 mm. Adults are on wing from late June to October in western Europe.

The larvae feed on Phragmites australis. They mine the leaves of their host plant. The mine starts as a corridor, but becomes as wide as the blade in the end half. The widening of the mine is accomplished by adding all tissue between two thick longitudinal veins. Most frass is concentrated in the lowest part of the mine, but part is ejected through a number of small holes. The larva spins a tube in the lowest part of the mine where it hibernates and where pupation takes place.

Subspecies
Cosmopterix scribaiella scribaiella
Cosmopterix scribaiella japonica Kuroko, 1960 (Japan)

References

scribaiella
Moths of Asia
Moths of Europe
Moths described in 1850